Krishnankutty Nair was an Indian  actor who worked in Malayalam cinema.
He was from Pippinmoodu, near Sasthamangalam, Thiruvananthapuram, Kerala. Nair worked with various theatre groups before becoming a film actor. 

Known for his natural acting and timing, Nair worked with world-renowned directors such as G. Aravindan, and Adoor Gopalakrishnan. He also acted in several movies by award-winning Malayalam filmmakers such as M. P. Sukumaran Nair, Lenin Rajendran, Padmarajan, Kamal, and Sathyan Anthikkad. He became popular among the public through his comic roles, primarily that of Kaalan Mathai in Kamal's Kakkothikkavile Appooppan Thaadikal, Thattan Gopalan in Anthikkad's Ponmuttayidunna Tharavu, and Kali Muthu in Anthikad's Mazhavilkavadi.

Death
In 1996, Krishnankutty Nair was seriously injured as a scooter he was riding pillion collided with a lorry. He succumbed to injuries after a month at the Government Medical College, Thiruvananthapuram.

Filmography 
 Avittam Thirunaal Aarogya Sriman (1995) ... K. K. Kizhakkedam
 Vrudhanmare Sookshikkuka (1995) ... Bheemasena Kurup
  Boxer (1995) ... Shaktidharan Pillai 
 Poochakkaru Mani Kettum (1994) ... Kaimal
 Dollar (1994) ... Uthuppu
 Sthalathe Pradhana Payyans (1993) ... Marukandam Madhavan
 Kavadiyattam (1993) ... Kurup
 Padaleeputhram (1993)
 Vakkeel Vasudev (1993)
 O'Faby (1993)
 Soubagyam (1993)
 Maanthrika Cheppu (1992) ... V. K. Nair
 Ezhara Ponnana (1992) ... Panikkar
 Ennodishtam Koodamo (1992) ... Veeran Nair
 Kizhakkan Pathrose (1992)
 Mookilla Rajyathu (1991) ... Bheem Singh 
 Aparahnam (1991)
 Ulladakkam (1991) ... Mental Patient
 Nettippattam (1991) ... Indus Father
 Kuttapathram (1991 ... Mithran
 Kankettu (1991) ... Pothuval
 Kadinjool Kalyanam (1991) ... Veerabhadran
 Cheppukilukkana Changathi (1991) ... Stamp Vizhungi Raman Pillai
 Chanchattam (1991) ... Superintendent
 Aakasha Kottayile Sultan (1991) ... Pushkaran
 Randam Varavu (1990) ... Nanappan
 Superstar (1990)... Sub Inspector
  Kottayam Kunjachan  (1990) ... Pachakkulam Vasu 
 Mathilukal (1990)
 Unnikuttanu Joli Kitti (1990)
 Dr. Pasupathy (1990) ... Nanu Nair
 Varnam (1989) ... K. Purushothaman
 Varavelpu (1989) ... Ramas Father
 Devadas (1989) ... Bhoothalingam 
 Mazhavilkavadi (1989) ... Kaleeswaran Kavalayil Kali Muthu
 Annakutty Kodambakkam Vilikkunnu (1989)
 Ponmuttayidunna Tharavu (1988) ... Gopalan
 Kakkothikkavile Appooppan Thaadikal (1988) ... Kaalan Mathai 
 Marattam (1988)
 Ore Thooval Pakshikal (1988)
 Anantaram (1987) 
 Oridathu (1986) ... Shekharan
 Arappatta Kettiya Graamathil ... . Kesava Menon  
 Kariyilakkattu Pole (1986) ... Appu Pillai
 Meenamasathile Sooryan (1986) ... Police officer
 Asthi(1983) ... Kumaran Nair
 Prem Nazirine Kanmanilla (1983) ... Mamachan
 Oridathoru Fayalvan (1981)... Veloonju
 Peruvazhiyambalam (1979)

Television
Kairali Vilasam Lodge (Doordarshan)
Manchiyam (Asianet) last telefilm he did in the year 1996

References

External links
 
 Krishnan Kutty Nair at MSI
 Krishnan Kutty Nair filmography 
 Krishnan Kutty Nair at M3DB 

Male actors from Thiruvananthapuram
Male actors in Malayalam cinema
20th-century Indian male actors
Indian male film actors
Year of birth missing
Malayalam comedians
Indian male comedians
1995 deaths
Road incident deaths in India